The Leyland Victory Mark 2 is a front-engined double-decker bus chassis manufactured by Leyland between 1978 and 1981. Like its competitor the Dennis Jubilant it was specifically designed for the contemporary operating environment (hilly roads and one-person operation with a farebox) in Hong Kong.

The chassis was developed from the Guy Victory J, which was also chosen by Bus Bodies (South Africa) for the development of its own double-decker. Four examples were delivered to Kowloon Motor Bus for evaluation. It could be fitted with Gardner 6LXB engine and Voith D851 gearbox, but one Victory Mark 2 for China Motor Bus had been experimentally fitted with Self-Changing Gears GB350 gearbox.

Almost all Leyland Victory Mark 2s built for Hong Kong were fitted with Alexander bodywork, but the last 20 buses built for China Motor Bus were fitted with Duple Metsec bodywork.

Elsewhere, single-deck versions of the Guy Victory were also operated in Southeast Asian cities like Singapore, Kuala Lumpur and Penang.

Operators
Kowloon Motor Bus (KMB) introduced 540 Victory Mark 2s between 1979 and 1983, including one unsuccessful air-conditioned coach which later had the air-conditioning unit removed. China Motor Bus (CMB) purchased 167 Victory Mark 2s between 1979 and 1982. New Lantao Bus (NLB) also purchased nine between 1980 and 1983, with a further six buses acquired from KMB in later years. In 1993 NLB sold 10 of its Victory Mark 2s to Citybus which took over 26 routes from CMB on 1 September 1993.

This model of double-decker bus has served nearly all regions in Hong Kong, including New Territories, Kowloon, Hong Kong Island, and Lantau Island.

All NLB and Citybus's Victory Mark 2s were withdrawn in the mid-1990s. KMB withdrew its last Victory Mark 2 in early 1998. CMB operated Victory Mark 2s until the takeover of its routes and vehicles, by New World First Bus on 1 September 1998, the ex-CMB Victory Mark 2s were gradually replaced by new low-floor buses, the last Victory Mark 2s were withdrawn on 31 August 2000.

Four Citybus Victory Mark 2s became service vehicles after withdrawal, whilst some withdrawn KMB/CMB Victory Mark 2s were sold on for use in rescue training.

Accidents
The Leyland Victory Mark 2 has a notorious reputation as an unsafe bus, mainly due to its soft suspension and high centre of gravity, which makes it prone to overturning.

Preservation
Some of the ex-China Motor Bus Victory Mark 2s had been saved for preservation. LV2, LV30 and LV158 are preserved in Hong Kong, LV36 was donated to Scottish Vintage Bus Museum.

Trivia
Leyland Victory Mark 2 was also known as "chicken" in Hong Kong because of its resemblance to chickens rocking back and forth while in motion, as a result of fitting in a rather soft suspension system.

References

External links
Images of KMB's Victorys
Images of CMB's Victorys
Images of NWFB's Victorys
Images of NLB's Victorys
Images of Citybus's (ex-NLB) Victorys

Double-decker buses
Victory
Vehicles introduced in 1978